Borgue may refer to the following places in Scotland:
 Borgue, Dumfries and Galloway, a parish and village in the south of Scotland
 Borgue, Highland, a village in the north of Scotland